Thioglycolic acid (TGA) is the organic compound HSCH2CO2H. TGA is often called mercaptoacetic acid (MAA). It contains both a thiol (mercaptan) and carboxylic acid functional groups. It is a colorless liquid with a strongly unpleasant odor. TGA is miscible with polar organic solvents.

Uses
TGA is used as a chemical depilatory and is still used as such, especially in salt forms, including calcium thioglycolate and sodium thioglycolate. TGA is the precursor to ammonium thioglycolate, which is used for permanents. TGA and its derivatives break the disulfide bonds in the cortex of hair. One reforms these broken bonds in giving hair a "perm". Alternatively and more commonly, the process leads to depilation, as is done commonly in leather processing. It is also used as an acidity indicator, manufacturing of thioglycolates, and in bacteriology for preparation of thioglycolate media. In fact thioglycolysis reactions used on condensed tannins to study their structure.

Organotin derivatives of thioglycolic acid isooctyl esters are widely used as stabilizers for PVC. These species have the formula R2Sn(SCH2CO2C8H17)2.

Applying TGA can soften nails and then fix pincer nails in the correct position. 

Sodium thioglycolate is a component of thioglycolate broth, a special bacterial growth media. It is also used in so-called "fallout remover" or "wheel cleaner" to remove iron oxide residue from wheels. Ferrous iron combines with thioglycolate to form red-violet ferric thioglycolate.

Production
Thioglycolic acid is prepared by reaction of sodium or potassium chloracetate with alkali metal hydrosulfide in aqueous medium. It can be also prepared via the Bunte salt obtained by reaction of sodium thiosulfate with chloroacetic acid:

ClCH2CO2H + Na2S2O3 → Na[O3S2CH2CO2H] + NaCl
Na[O3S2CH2CO2H] + H2O → HSCH2CO2H + NaHSO4

Reactions
Thioglycolic acid with a pKa of 3.83  is about 10 times stronger an acid than acetic acid (pKa 4.76):
HSCH2CO2H → HSCH2CO2− + H+
The second ionization has a pKa of 9.3:
 HSCH2CO2− → −SCH2CO2− + H+

Thioglycolic acid is a reducing agent, especially at higher pH. It oxidizes to the corresponding disulfide (2-[(carboxymethyl)disulfanyl]acetic acid or dithiodiglycolic acid):
2 HSCH2CO2H + "O" → [SCH2CO2H]2 + H2O

With metal ions
Thioglycolic acid, usually as its dianion, forms complexes with metal ions. Such complexes have been used for the detection of iron, molybdenum, silver, and tin. Thioglycolic acid reacts with diethyl acetylmalonate to form acetylmercaptoacetic acid and diethyl malonate, the reducing agent in conversion of Fe(III) to Fe(II).

History
Scientist David R. Goddard, in the early 1930s, identified TGA as a useful reagent for reducing the disulfide bonds in proteins, including keratin (hair protein), while studying why protease enzymes could not easily digest hair, nails, feathers, and such. He realized that while the disulfide bonds, which stabilize proteins by cross-linking, were broken, the structures containing these proteins could be reshaped easily, and that they would retain this shape after the disulfide bonds were allowed to re-form. TGA was developed in the 1940s for use as a chemical depilatory.

Safety and detection
The LD50 (oral, rat) is 261 mg/kg, LC50 inhalation for rat is 21 mg/m3 for 4 h, and LD50 dermal for rabbit is 848 mg/kg. Mercaptoacetic acid in hair waving and depilatory products containing other mercapto acids can be identified by using thin-layer chromatography and gas chromatography. MAA also has been identified by using potentiometric titration with silver nitrate solution.

See also
Glycolic acid
Ammonium thioglycolate
Thiolactic acid

References

Further reading
Okada K, Okada E. Novel treatment using thioglycolic acid for pincer nails. J. Dermatol. 2012, volume 39, pp. 996-999.

Thiols
Acetic acids
Chelating agents
Foul-smelling chemicals